Roko Baturina (born 20 June 2000) is a Croatian footballer who plays as a forward for Spanish side Racing Santander, on loan from Hungarian team Ferencváros.

Career
In August 2017, Baturina joined GNK Dinamo Zagreb together with his younger brothers Martin and Marin.

Honours

Club
Dinamo Zagreb
Croatian Football Super Cup: 2019

Ferencváros
Nemzeti Bajnokság I: 2020–21, 2021–22
Magyar Kupa: 2021–22

References

External links 
 
 Roko Baturina at HNS 

2000 births
Living people
Footballers from Split, Croatia
Association football forwards
Croatian footballers
Croatia youth international footballers
RNK Split players
GNK Dinamo Zagreb players
GNK Dinamo Zagreb II players
NK Bravo players
Ferencvárosi TC footballers
Lech Poznań players
Lech Poznań II players
NK Maribor players
Racing de Santander players
Croatian Football League players
First Football League (Croatia) players
Slovenian PrvaLiga players
Nemzeti Bajnokság I players
II liga players
Segunda División players
Croatian expatriate footballers
Expatriate footballers in Slovenia
Croatian expatriate sportspeople in Slovenia
Expatriate footballers in Hungary
Croatian expatriate sportspeople in Hungary
Expatriate footballers in Poland
Croatian expatriate sportspeople in Poland
Expatriate footballers in Spain
Croatian expatriate sportspeople in Spain